Dead Man Walking or Dead Man Walkin or Dead Men Walking may refer to:

Arts, entertainment and media 
 Dead Man Walking (book), a 1993 non-fiction book by Sister Helen Prejean
 Dead Man Walking (film), a 1995 film based on the book
 Dead Man Walking (soundtrack), 1986, and the title song "Dead Man Walkin by Bruce Springsteen
 Dead Man Walking (opera), 2000, by Jake Heggie, based on the book
 Dead Man Walking (play), 2002, by Tim Robbins, based on the book
 "Dead Man Walking" (Sapphire & Steel), an audio drama based on the TV series 
 Dead Men Walking (film), a 2005 film

Television episodes
 "Dead Man Walking" (Body of Proof), 2011
 "Dead Man Walking" (NCIS), 2007
 "Dead Man Walking" (Robin Hood), 2006
 "Dead Man Walking" (Torchwood), 2008
 "Dead Man Walking" (Taggart), 2005

Music
 Dead Men Walking, a British rock band

Albums
 [[Dead Man Walkin' (Snoop Dogg album)|Dead Man Walkin''' (Snoop Dogg album)]], 2000
 Dead Man Walking (John Tibbs album), 2016
 Dead Man Walking (EP), by John Tibbs, 2015

Songs
 "Dead Man Walking" (song), by David Bowie, 1997
 "Dead Man Walking", by 2 Chainz, 2020
 "Dead Man Walking", by Bloodsimple from Red Harvest, 2007
 "Dead Man Walking", by Body Count from Violent Demise: The Last Days, 1997
 "Dead Man Walking", by Brent Faiyaz, 2020
 "Dead Man Walking", by Fear Factory from Digimortal, 2001
 "Dead Man Walking", by Jeremy Camp from The Story's Not Over, 2019
 "Dead Man Walking", by Jon Bellion
 "Dead Man Walkin, by Lynyrd Skynyrd from Vicious Cycle, 2003
 "Dead Man Walking", by Milanese featuring Virus Syndicate
 "Dead Man Walking", by Quarashi from Guerilla Disco, 2004
 "Dead Man Walking", by the Script from Science & Faith, 2010
 "Dead Man Walking", by Smiley, 2012

Tornadoes"Dead man walking" is a phrase used to describe the certain look of some multi-vortex tornadoes: 1974 Xenia, Ohio F5 tornado
 1997 Jarrell, Texas F5 tornado
 2011 Cullman—Arab, Alabama EF4 tornado
 2011 Joplin EF5 tornado

See also

 Walking Dead (disambiguation)
 Dead clade walking, or extinction debt, in ecology
 Dead Man's Walk'', a 1995 novel by Larry McMurtry
 Dead Man's Walk, Oxford, a footpath in England